Speer Boulevard, in Denver, Colorado, is a historic parkway.  It runs from Irving St. in the West Highland neighborhood to Downing St. in the Country Club neighborhood, was built in 1906, and was listed on the National Register of Historic Places in 1986.

It is part of the Denver Park and Parkway System, which includes 16 parkways and 15 parks.  It runs along the channel of Cherry Creek and includes the boulevard and triangles.

Design has been credited to both George Kessler and landscape architect S.R. DeBoer. The National Register Nomination states "Although the basic design was Kessler's, DeBoer's strong hand was involved in much of the planting design..."

It includes three contributing structures and a contributing object.

The boulevard is named for Robert W. Speer, "who, according to some, single handedly brought the City Beautiful movement to Denver during his terms as mayor (1904-1912 and 1916-1918)."

References

National Register of Historic Places in Denver
Buildings and structures completed in 1906
1906 establishments in Colorado